The Diocese of Teruel and Albarracín (Latin, Turolensis, Albarracinensis) is a Roman Catholic ecclesiastical territory located in north-eastern Spain, in the province of Teruel, part of the autonomous community of Aragón. The diocese forms part of the ecclesiastical province of Zaragoza, and is thus suffragan to the Archdiocese of Zaragoza.

In 1912 the diocese of Teruel comprised the civil province of the same name, excepting the town of Bechi (Castellón).

All the churches of Teruel are contemporary with its foundation (1176), as the founders built nine churches, one, Santa Maria de Mediavilla, in the centre, and the remaining eight in a circle following the circuit of the walls. The central church was made a collegiate church in 1423 and named the cathedral in 1577. It was originally built of brick and rubblework, but since the restoration in the seventeenth century it has lost its primitive character. The Doric choir stalls were the gift of Martín Terrer de Valenzuela, Bishop of Teruel, and later of Tarazona.

History

Roman period
It is believed by some that Teruel and the ancient Turba are the same. Turba was the city whose disputes with the Saguntines gave Hannibal an excuse for attacking Saguntum and beginning the Second Punic War. According to the annals of Teruel it appears that Turba was not situated on the site of the present city of Teruel, but at its boundary line.

Middle Ages (1176–1577)
Teruel was founded in 1176 by Sancho Sánchez Muñoz and Blasco Garcés Marcilla. It formed a separate community and was governed by the Fuero de Sepúlveda.

King Jaime I received its support in the conquest of Valencia (1238), and the standards of Teruel were the first to wave in the gateway of Serranos. In 1271 it joined in the war against Castile, invaded Huete and Cuenca.

Teruel sided with king Pedro IV in his war against the "Union". In recognition of this the king visited the city in 1348 and conferred upon it the title of exenta (exempt).

Ferdinand and Isabella visited Teruel in 1482, took the oath in the cathedral, and received the freedom of the city. The founding of the Inquisition in 1484 produced serious changes because the converts were numerous and powerful. The inquisitor, Juan de Solivellia, was forced to leave. Property to the amount of 133,000 sueldos was confiscated and turned over to the city.

Diocese of Teruel (1577–1851)
Pope Gregory XIII at the earnest solicitations of king Philip II created the diocese in 1577. The first bishop, Juan Pérez de Artieda, was elected but not consecrated; the first bishop installed was Andrés Santos de Sampedro, who was transferred to Saragossa in 1579.

In 1598 the inhabitants of Teruel abjured the Fuero de Sepúlveda before the courts of Aragon, in order to come under the Government of Aragon.

The seminary, dedicated to St. Toribio de Mogrovejo, was founded by the bishop Francisco José Rodríguez Chico, who after the expulsion of the Jesuits in 1769 was granted the use of their magnificent college by king Charles III. During the wars of independence and the civil wars that followed, the building was taken over for military quarters and shortly afterwards the seminary was suppressed. It was re-established in 1849 by Don Antonio Lao y Cuevas, who gave his own palace for the purpose. The Jesuit college has since been restored to the order.

Among the distinguished citizens of Teruel must be mentioned:
 Jerónimo Ripalda, S.J.
 the jurisconsult Gaspar de Castellot.
 Miguel Jerónimo de Castellot, judge of the courts of Aragon, 1665.
 Fray Juan Cebrián de Perales, Bishop of Albarracín.
 Juan Martínez Salafranca, Viceroy of Aragon, founder of the Academy of History.

Diocese of Teruel-Albarracín (1852–1984)
In 1851 or 1852 the see became Diocese of Teruel-Albarracín (probably as a consequence of the Concordat of 1851 suppressing the Diocese of Albarracín).

Diocese of Teruel and Albarracín (since 1985)
In 1985 the see became Diocese of Teruel and Albarracín.

Bishops of Teruel (1577–1851)
. . . . . 1577–1578 : Juan Pérez de Artieda — (Elected)
 1578–1579 : Andrés Santos de Sampedro
 1580–1594 : Jaime Jimeno de Lobera
 1596–1611 : Martín Terrer de Valenzuela
 1614–1624 : Tomás Cortés de Sangüesa
 1625–1633 : Fernando de Valdés y Llanos
 1633–1635 : Pedro Apaolaza Ramírez
 1635–1644 : Juan Cebrián Pedro
 1644–1647 : Domingo Abad Herta
 1647–1672 : Diego Chueca
 --------–1673 : Diego Francés de Urritigoyti y Lerma
 1674–1682 : Andrés Aznar Navés
 1683–1700 : Jerónimo Zolivera
 1701–1717 : Lamberto Manuel López
 1720–1731 : Pedro Felipe Miranda y Ponce de León
 1732–1755 : Francisco Pérez de Prado y Cuesta
 1755–1757 : Francisco Javier Pérez Baroja y Muro
 1757–1780 : Francisco José Rodríguez Chico
 1780–1794 : Roque Martín Merino
 1795–1799 : Félix Rico
 1800–1802 : Francisco Javier de Lizana y Beaumont
 1802–1814 : Blas Joaquín Álvarez de Palma
 1815–1825 : Felipe Montoya Díez
 1825–1827 : Jacinto Rodríguez Rico
 1827–1831 : Diego Martínez Carlón y Teruel
 1831–1833 : José Asensio Ocón y Toledo
 1847–1850 : Antonio Lao y Cuevas
 1850–1851 : Jaime José Soler Roquer

Bishops of Teruel-Albarracín (1852–1984)
 1852–1861 : Francisco Landeira Sevilla
 1861–1869 : Francisco de Paula Jiménez Muñoz
 1874–1876 : Victoriano Guisasola Rodríguez
 1876–1880 : Francisco de Paula Moreno y Andreu
 1880–1890 : Antonio Ibáñez Galiano
 1891–1894 : Maximiliano Fernández del Rincón y Soto Dávila
 1894–1896 : Antonio Estalella y Sivilla
 1896–1905 : Juan Comes Vidal
 1905–1934 : Juan Antón de la Fuente
 1935–1939 : Anselmo Polanco y Fontecha
 1944–1968 : León Villuendas Polo
 1968–1972 : Juan Ricote Alonso
 1974–1984 : Damián Iguacén Borau

Bishops of Teruel and Albarracín (since 1985)
 1985–2003 : Antonio Ángel Algora Hernando
 2004–2009 : José Manuel Lorca Planes
 2010–2016 : Carlos Manuel Escribano Subias
 2016–2021 : Antonio Gómez Cantero
 2021–...  : José Antonio Satué Huerto

References
This article draws only from other Wikipedia articles and these two sources:
  
  IBERCRONOX: Obispado de Teruel y Albarracín

See also
 List of the Roman Catholic dioceses of Spain.

Aragon
Teruel and Albarracin
Religious organizations established in 1577
Teruel and Albarracín
Albarracin
Teruel